The Gujarat Sahitya Akademi or Gujarat Sahitya Academy, established in 1981, is a government institution dedicated to the development of the languages spoken in Gujarat, India and their literature. Gujarati, an official language of Gujarat, is one of them; the others are Hindi, Sanskrit, Kutchi, Sindhi and Urdu. , Bhagyesh Jha is the chairman of the Akademi.

History 
The Akademi was founded on 24 September 1981 by the Government of Gujarat. It was inaugurated on 17 June 1982 with the appointment of a chairman, a vice chairman and other members.

Activity 
The main aim of the Akademi is to:
 Encourage organizations and writers in Gujarat to promote the development of Gujarati, Sanskrit and other modern languages
 Promote the research of Gujarati folk literature
 Collect and publish books of literature
 Assemble and maintain a library
 Recognize and aid literary societies
 Publish criticism of various forms of literature
 Organize birthday celebrations for noted authors
 Award prizes for books published in different forms of literature
 Award financial scholarships to students of literature
 Financially assist elderly, physically handicapped, and indigent authors living in Gujarat.
 Annually award Sahitya Gaurav Puraskar to an established author and Yuva Gaurav Puraskar to a young writer.
 Since 2016, the Akademi has conferred the Sahityaratna Award to Gujarati authors for their significant contribution; and the Ramanlal Nilkanth Hasya Paritoshik which is conferred to Gujarati authors for their significant contribution in Gujarati humorous literature.

Organisation 
The Gujarat Academy oversees five other academies; namely the Hindi Sahitya Academy for Hindi, the Sanskrit Sahitya Academy for Sanskrit, the Kutchi Sahitya Academy for Kutchi, the Sindhi Sahitya Academy for Sindhi and the Urdu Sahitya Academy for Urdu. The registrar is the administrative head of all five academies. There are three standing committees, each of which has ten members, including five official members, for folk literature, Sanskrit language and literature, and other modern Indian languages.

The chairman, the vice chairman and the registrar have day to day control of the Akademi. The Akademi's overall controlling authorities are the general body and the executive council. The term of the general body is 5 years. The general body is made of 41 members including the education commissioner of Gujarat, the financial adviser of the education department, the registrar of Akademi, the higher education commissioner of Gujarat, the director of language of Gujarat, five members from the Gujarati literary community selected by the state government, 9 members selected by the committee appointed by representative of different Gujarati literary institutions, 8 members representing of the University of Gujarat, 3 members selected by the members of the general body of the Akademi, 9 members selected by a committee appointed by Gujarati writers, 2 members who have been awarded the Sahitya Gaurav Puraskar. The executive council is made up of a maximum of ten members including the chairman, the registrar and the vice-chairman of the Akademi, the education commissioner of Gujarat, the financial adviser of the education department, the education commissioner of Gujarat and five members of the general body selected by the state government.

List of chairmen
Following people served as chairmen:

List of registrars 
Following people served as registrars:

Controversy 
The Akademi is an autonomous body empowered by its constitution to elect its chairman through a voting process by the 41 members of the general body.

The Akademi did not have a chairman from 2003 to 2015 as the government did not held an election. It was run by the registrar in-charge and the secretary of the sports, youth and cultural activities department; ex-offcio. In April 2015, the state government appointed Bhagyesh Jha, a Gujarati writer and retired IAS officer, as the new chairman of the Akademi without any election. This resulted in the Autonomous Academy Agitation (Swayatta Akademi Andolan) led by Gujarati Sahitya Parishad, the oldest literary institute in Gujarat and several Gujarati writers including Manishi Jani, Shirish Panchal, Dhiru Parikh, Chandrakant Topiwala, Bharat Mehta, Paresh Naik and Raju Solanki. Parishad boycotted the activities of the Akademi in protest. In March 2016, the Gujarati poet Harsh Brahmbhatt declined the award which had been conferred to him by the Akademi for his book. In November 2015, Bhagyesh Jha and two other writers Chinu Modi and Vinod Bhatt, said to be the supporter of Jha, used the word Taliban for the writers like Dhiru Parikh and Niranjan Bhagat, who had supported the agitation. Pravin Pandya returned the award he had received in 2004 in protest. Another Gujarati writer and literary critic, Bharat Mehta, returned the award which he had received in 2008. Dhiru Parikh, along with other writers, submitted a public interest litigation to the Gujarat High Court. In January 2020, another writer Bipin Patel refused the award presented by Akademi for his story collection Vaans Na Ful citing the inaction by the government to restore autonomy of the Akademi.

See also
Gujarat Sahitya Sabha
Gujarat Vidhya Sabha

References

External links
 
 

Gujarati literature
1981 establishments in Gujarat
Organizations established in 1981
Government of Gujarat
Indic literature societies
Book publishing companies of India
Arts organizations established in 1981
Language regulators